Choi Sae-hwang (30 August 1919 – 11 October 1992) was a South Korean lawyer and government official.

Early life
Choi was born in Sariwon, Hwanghae (today North Hwanghae, North Korea). He graduated from the Faculty of Law of Chuo University in Tokyo, Japan in 1941.

Government career
After his graduation, Choi returned to Korea, where he worked as a prosecutor of the Cheongju District Court (청주지방법원) under the Japanese colonial government. When Korea regained its independence, he found employment with the new South Korean government, first with the High Prosecutors' Office in 1948, with the Supreme Prosecutors' Office in 1949, as head of the Bureau of Prisons (행형국) under the Ministry of Justice in 1951, and as Chief Prosecutor of Jeonju in 1952. He was named South Korea's Vice-Minister of National Defense in August 1957, succeeding Kim Jeong-ryeol (김정렬) who was promoted to Minister. He was one of the members of the founding committee of the Democratic Republican Party in February 1963. The Ministry of Foreign Affairs appointed him as a representative in South Korea's discussions with Japan on a fisheries treaty that month.

Later life
Choi went on to work as a lawyer in private practice, and later became the president of Hansung Transportation.

Choi was an avid golfer. He became a member of the board of directors of the Seoul Country Club in 1969, and was elected chairman of the board in 1980.

He died on the morning of 11 October 1992 at the Chung-Ang University Hospital in Seoul. He was survived by his wife Kim Yeong-ja, two sons, and two daughters.

References

1919 births
1992 deaths
Place of birth missing
South Korean politicians
Chuo University alumni
People from Sariwon
South Korean prosecutors